Shannon Lamont Mitchell (born March 28, 1972) is a former American football tight end who played four seasons with the San Diego Chargers of the National Football League. He played college football at the University of Georgia and attended Alcoa High School in Alcoa, Tennessee.

References

External links
Just Sports Stats
College stats

Living people
1972 births
Players of American football from Tennessee
American football tight ends
African-American players of American football
Georgia Bulldogs football players
San Diego Chargers players
People from Alcoa, Tennessee
21st-century African-American sportspeople
20th-century African-American sportspeople